Frank Lawler (June 25, 1842 – January 17, 1896) was a U.S. Representative from Illinois.

Born in Rochester, New York, Lawler attended the public schools. He moved with his parents to Chicago, Illinois in 1854. He was a news agent on a railroad for several years and also a brakeman. He learned the trade of shipbuilders. He was active in organizing trade and labor unions, and served as president of the Ship Carpenters and Calkers' Association. He was employed in the Chicago post office as a letter carrier 1869-1877. He served as a member of the city council from 1876 to 1885. He engaged in business as a liquor merchant in 1878.

Lawler was elected as a Democrat to the Forty-ninth, Fiftieth, and Fifty-first Congresses (March 4, 1885 – March 3, 1891). He was an unsuccessful candidate for sheriff of Cook County in 1891. He was an unsuccessful candidate for election in 1895 to the Fifty-fourth Congress.

Lawler was again elected a member of the board of aldermen in 1896 and served until his death in Chicago at age 53. A Catholic, he was interred in Calvary Cemetery.

References

1842 births
1896 deaths
Chicago City Council members
American trade union leaders
Catholics from Illinois
Democratic Party members of the United States House of Representatives from Illinois
19th-century American politicians
Burials at Calvary Cemetery (Evanston, Illinois)
Illinois Democrats